Kesar (also Romanized as Kesār; also known as Kesār Varzal, Kīsār, and Kvisar) is a village in Lakan Rural District, in the Central District of Rasht County, Gilan Province, Iran. At the 2006 census, its population was 56, in 11 families.

References 

Populated places in Rasht County